Mariya Vasilyevna Payun (born 17 July 1953) is a Soviet rower.

References

External links 
 
 
 

1953 births
Living people
Russian female rowers
Soviet female rowers
Rowers at the 1980 Summer Olympics
Olympic silver medalists for the Soviet Union
Olympic rowers of the Soviet Union
Olympic medalists in rowing
World Rowing Championships medalists for the Soviet Union
Medalists at the 1980 Summer Olympics